GigaBash is an action kaiju brawler game developed and published by Malaysian independent studio Passion Republic Games. It was released for Windows, PlayStation 4 and PlayStation 5 on August 5, 2022.

Gameplay 
GigaBash is an action brawler in which the player assumes control of a kaiju and must battle each other in stages filled with destructible environments. These monsters can perform light and a heavy attack, and unleash a unique special move. They can also dodge, perform an air dash, and hurl buildings and objects at their opponents. As the player deals damage to opponents, they will gain Giga-energy. With sufficient Giga-energy, the kaiju will transform into a "S-class" monster, which is significantly stronger and larger. During a match, a Giga-ball will emerge. The kaiju that acquires a Giga-ball can unleash an ultimate attack that deals devastating damage to other opponents. At launch, the game would feature 10 different monsters.

The game features both local and online multiplayer. In battle mode, players can engage in free-for-all battle, or split into two teams and combat each other. While the game supports up to four players, solo players can also compete against characters controlled by artificial intelligence. In addition, the game features four single-player campaigns which follow the story of four monsters: Gorogong, Pipijuras, Woolley, and Thundatross. In addition, the game also has a Mayhem mode, which is a party mode in which players can complete various minigames together.

Development 
GigaBash is the debut title for Malaysian independent game development studio Passion Republic Games. The monsters in the game were inspired by classic tokusatsu characters including Godzilla, Megazord, and Ultraman. Video games, such as games based on the WWE license, King of the Monsters, Rampage, Gundam Versus, War of the Monsters and Power Stone also influenced the team. Party games, such as Overcooked and Rocket League were also major sources of inspiration. The team also included a story mode, which serves as an "extension" to the core battle mode. This mode will explore the background of four different monsters and their origin. The game's control scheme was designed to be accessible and simple, though the player's attack will be modified by other contextual factors, such as if the player is blocking, dashing or grabbing. Each playable character in the game went through multiple phases of design and development. Gorogong, the game's first publicly revealed character, was described as an "all-rounded" monster that resembles other classic kaiju.

The first teaser trailer for the game premiered on September 12, 2019. The game was released in August 5, 2022 for PlayStation 4, PlayStation 5, and Windows. 
During the 2022 Tokyo Game Show, it was announced that Godzilla would join the roster as a guest character. A teaser for Godzilla's appearance in the game was released on November 2, with the character set to join the game as part of a DLC on December 9. On November 16 the Godzilla collab DLC was announced to release two days earlier than its intentional release date on December 7th instead of December 9th. Three other kaiju from the Godzilla series; Gigan, Kiryu, and Destoroyah, have been confirmed to be released along with Godzilla himself in the DLC.  Three trailers that foreshadow each of the other three kaijus were released on November 16th, 23rd, and 30th respectively.

Reception 

GigaBash received "mixed or average" reviews upon release, according to review aggregator Metacritic. 

Mitchell Saltzman of IGN gave the a game an 7/10 rating, praising the game's simple controls, character movesets and gimmick-filled stages; he concluded that these characteristics made more suited for casual local play than solo or even online play, modes he deemed "at least present and serviceable".

References

External links 
 

2022 video games
Windows games
PlayStation 4 games
PlayStation 5 games
Video games developed in Malaysia
Unreal Engine games
Action video games
Party video games
Multiplayer and single-player video games
Kaiju video games
Fighting games